The Philippines participated at the 18th Southeast Asian Games held in Chiang Mai, Thailand from 9 to 17 December 1995.

SEA Games performance
The Philippines ended up third overall, competing in 25 of 28 events contested. The Filipinos could only bring home 33 gold medals, short of the 57 they harvested in 1993 in what emerged as their second-worst performance in the biennial meet. It was a modest finish, this was how Philippine Sports Commission chair Philip Ella Juico assessed the results of the Philippine participation in the 18th SEA Games.

Elma Muros-Posadas, new queen of Philippine athletics, emerged as the most bemedalled Filipino athlete with three golds. Other Filipinos who excelled were Joselito Santos (cycling), Ryan Papa (swimming), Anecia Pedroso and John Baylon (judo), the Philippine men's basketball team, which kept the cage title by routing Thailand, 108–89, in the finals, Hector Begeo and Edward Lasquete (athletics), and Alvin de los Santos (weightlifting).

Medalists

Gold

Silver

Bronze

Multiple

Medal summary

By sports

References

External links
http://www.olympic.ph

Southeast Asian Games
Nations at the 1995 Southeast Asian Games
1995